A pro-chancellor is an officer of some universities in Commonwealth countries. The pro-chancellor acts as a deputy to the chancellor and as practical chairman of the university council. In this role, a pro-chancellor may fulfil a number of formal and informal functions, such as presiding over conferment of degrees, regulatory oversight of the university, and facilitating partnerships or relationships in other settings. The actual chief executive of a university is the vice-chancellor.

See also
 Lists of university leaders
 Administrators: trustee, president, vice president, university principal, dean, provost
 Other: college, faculty, professor

University governance
Academic administration
Academic honours
Education and training occupations